is an isometric shooter arcade video game, developed and released by Sega in 1982, in which the player pilots a ship through heavily defended space fortresses. Japanese electronics company Ikegami Tsushinki is also credited for having worked on the development of the game.

Zaxxon was the first game to employ axonometric projection, which lent its name to the game (AXXON from AXONometric projection). The type of axonometric projection is isometric projection: this effect simulates three dimensions from a third-person viewpoint. It was also the first arcade game to be advertised on television, with a commercial produced by Paramount Pictures for $150,000. The game was a critical and commercial success upon release, becoming one of the top five highest-grossing arcade games of 1982 in the United States. Sega followed it up with the arcade sequel Super Zaxxon (1982) and Zaxxon-like shooter Future Spy (1984), in addition to the non-scrolling isometric platform game Congo Bongo (1983).

Gameplay 

The objective of the game is to hit as many targets as possible without being shot down or running out of fuel—which can be replenished, paradoxically, by blowing up fuel drums (300 points). There are two fortresses to fly through, with an outer space segment between them. At the end of the second fortress is a boss in the form of the Zaxxon robot.

The player's ship casts a shadow to indicate its height. An altimeter is also displayed; in space there is nothing for the ship to cast a shadow on. The walls at the entrance and exit of each fortress have openings that the ship must be at the right altitude to pass through. Within each fortress are additional walls that the ship's shadow and altimeter aid in flying over successfully.

The game is controlled by a four-directional joystick. On arcade cabinets this is an aircraft-type stick with a molded hand grip. Pushing forward makes the player's aircraft lower in altitude and pulling back makes it rise. The aircraft cannot move forward or backward; it flies at constant speed. As this sort of control and movement was not common in video games, the arcade cabinets have illustrations around the joystick to indicate the effect of each position on the aircraft.

Ports 
Between 1982 and 1985, Zaxxon was ported to the Apple II, Atari 8-bit family, Atari 2600, Atari 5200, MSX, ZX Spectrum, Commodore 64, Dragon 32, ColecoVision, Intellivision, IBM PC compatibles, Sega SG-1000, TRS-80 Color Computer, and TRS-80. The Atari 2600 and Intellivision ports use a third-person, behind-the-ship perspective instead of the isometric graphics of the other versions.

Reception

Commercial 
The arcade game was a major commercial success in North America. Zaxxon reached the top of the monthly US RePlay arcade charts in June 1982. The Amusement & Music Operators Association (AMOA) later listed it among the top six highest-grossing arcade games of 1982 in the United States.

The game did not appear on the annual  lists of top twenty highest-grossing arcade games 1982. Game Machine later listed Zaxxon in their June 1, 1983 issue as the eighth top-grossing table arcade cabinet of the month.

The ColecoVision version was also commercially successful. Zaxxon was Coleco's best-selling non-bundled cartridge for the ColecoVision up until 1983.

The home computer ports were commercially successful in North America and Europe. II Computing listed Zaxxon fourth on its list of top Apple II games as of late 1985, based on sales and market-share data. U.S. Gold's home computer version of Zaxxon was ranked number-two on the UK software sales chart in early 1985.

Reviews 
The arcade game was well received upon release. David Cohen in his book Video Games praised the "incredible three-dimensional realism" in the graphics, which he considered the best in a video game to date, while describing the gameplay as "a mixture of driving and zap game." Computer and Video Games praised the game for being "at the frontier of a third dimension in arcade games" and for its "realistic" altitude-based gameplay for the time.

Video Games in 1983 called the ColecoVision version of Zaxxon a "coup for this new system". Video magazine also praised the ColecoVision version in its "Arcade Alley" column, describing it as "one of the most thrilling games available", and noting in passing that the only "serious criticism" of the arcade original was that "many players felt they needed flying lessons to have even a ghost of a chance of performing well". K-Power rated the  Color Computer version with 8 points out of 10. The magazine praised its "excellent three-dimensional graphics", and concluded that "Zaxxon is a game that can't be praised enough".

Softline in 1983 called the Atari 8-bit version "a superb three-dimensional computer game ... Not since Choplifter has a game looked so impressive". The magazine also liked the graphics of the Apple II and TRS-80 versions despite those computers' hardware limitations, and predicted that Zaxxon would be a "long-lived bestseller". In 1984 the magazine's readers named the game the fifth most-popular Apple program, the worst Apple program, and third-worst Atari program of 1983.

Awards 
At the 1982 Arkie Awards, the arcade game received a Certificate of Merit as runner-up for Best Science Fiction/Fantasy Coin-Op Game. At the 1983 Arcade Awards, the console cartridge conversion received a Certificate of Merit as runner-up for Videogame of the Year. At the 1984 Arkie Awards, the dedicated console version was awarded Stand-Alone Game of the Year, while the home computer conversion received a Certificate of Merit as runner-up for Computer Game of the Year. In January 1985, Electronic Games magazine included Zaxxon in its Hall of Fame. In 1995, Flux magazine ranked the arcade version 51st on their "Top 100 Video Games."

Legacy

Re-releases 
Zaxxon is a bonus game in the Sega Genesis Collection for the PlayStation 2. It is also an unlockable arcade game in Sonic's Ultimate Genesis Collection for the Xbox 360 and PlayStation 3. The arcade version was released on the Wii Virtual Console in Japan on December 15, 2009, the PAL region on March 5, 2010, and North America on April 12, 2010. In 2022, the original arcade version will be included as part of the Sega Astro City Mini V, a vertically oriented variant of the Sega Astro City mini console.

Sequels 
Zaxxon was followed by an arcade sequel in November 1982: Super Zaxxon. It has a different color scheme, the player's ship flies faster (making the game more difficult), the space segment is replaced with a tunnel, and the enemy at the end of the second fortress is a dragon. It did not do as well as the original. Super Zaxxon topped the US RePlay arcade chart for software conversion kits in July 1983. In 1984, Sega released Future Spy with a similar style.

In 1987 Zaxxon 3-D was released for the Master System. This console variation makes use of the 3-D glasses add-on. As with the Atari 2600 and Intellivision ports, it is forward-scrolling rather than isometric.

Zaxxon's Motherbase 2000 was released for the Sega 32X in 1995. It is the first Zaxxon game to incorporate polygon graphics. The game bore the Zaxxon brand only in the United States, as the Japanese version was named Parasquad and the European version was named Motherbase. U.S. gaming critics generally remarked that the game was not similar enough to Zaxxon to justify the use of the brand.

Zaxxon Escape was released on October 4, 2012, for iOS and Android devices. The game was criticized for having little resemblance to the original.

Popular culture 

In 1982 Milton Bradley released a Zaxxon board game.

In Paramount's 1984 film Friday the 13th: The Final Chapter, the character Tommy Jarvis, played by Corey Feldman, plays Zaxxon during his introduction.

In 2012, Zaxxon was shown at "The Art of Video Games" exhibition at the Smithsonian.

Notes

References

External links 
 
 

1982 video games
Apple II games
Arcade video games
Intellivision games
Atari 2600 games
ZX Spectrum games
Atari 5200 games
Atari 8-bit family games
Cancelled Atari Jaguar games
ColecoVision games
Commodore 64 games
Gremlin Industries games
MSX games
Scrolling shooters
Sega arcade games
Sega Games franchises
TRS-80 Color Computer games
Master System games
SG-1000 games
U.S. Gold games
Video games developed in Japan
Video games with isometric graphics
Video games with stereoscopic 3D graphics
Virtual Console games
Multiplayer and single-player video games